Mamiyar Thevai  is a 2013 Indian Tamil-language soap opera that aired on Zee Tamil. The show premiered on 15 April 2013 and aired Monday through Friday 8:00PM IST. The show stars Yuvarani, Subhalekha Sudhakar, Srithika, Mahalakshmi, Vandhana and Sonia. It was directed by Sulaimaan.K.Babu. The show last aired on 21 February 2014 with 244 episodes.

Plot
It is the story of a joint family, which consists of a father, three sons, three daughters-in-law and their children. The father lost his wife few years ago. He now wants to retire and the sons want the family property to be divided. While his children are keen on the property, issues arise in the family. He is devastated and his youngest daughter-in-law, Meera, helps him out with a surprising solution. She suggests a mother-in-law for the family and a wife for him. In the course of a series of events that follow, she starts the hunt for an appropriate mother-in-law and in the process finds Gayathri. Meera feels Gayathri is the right person to handle all the people and sort out all the problems in the household. Meera, who has been brought up in an orphanage, has a past which haunts her often.

Cast
 Yuvarani as Gayathri
 Srithika as Meera
 Mahalakshmi replaced Srithika
 Subhalekha Sudhakar
 Sonia
 Vandhana
 Kumaresan 
 Sukiran  
 Viswanath

References

External links
 

Zee Tamil original programming
Tamil-language melodrama television series
2013 Tamil-language television series debuts
Tamil-language television shows
2014 Tamil-language television series endings
Television shows set in Tamil Nadu